Shahivand may refer to:

 Shahivand, alternate name of Eslamiyeh, Ilam
 Shahivand, alternate name of Heyvand, Ilam Province
 Shahivand District
 Shahivand Ali Morad